South Carolina Highway 55 (SC 55) is a  primary state highway in the U.S. state of South Carolina. It connects the city of Clover to Blacksburg, Rock Hill, and Charlotte, North Carolina.

Route description

SC 55 is a rural two-lane highway, with a median in and around Clover; between Clover and Lake Wylie, it is also paralleled by a major transmission line.  It traverses from SC 5 near Kings Creek, to SC 49/SC 274 near Lake Wylie. Travelers to and from Charlotte would connect through SC 557, just east of Clover.

History

The first SC 55 appeared in either 1925 or 1926 as a new primary routing from SC 21 near Greenwood, to SC 24 in Friendship. By 1930, it was renumbered as part of SC 24; today it is part of U.S. Route 178 (US 178).

The current SC 55 was established in 1931 as a new primary routing from Kings Creek to Lake Wylie. The highway was fully paved by 1942. In 2012, SC 55 was widened with a median through Clover.

Major intersections

See also

References

External links

SC 55 South Carolina Hwy Index

055
Transportation in Cherokee County, South Carolina
Transportation in York County, South Carolina